Mid-term parliamentary elections were held in Costa Rica on 5 December 1915. The result was a victory for the Republican Party, which received almost two-thirds of the vote. Voter turnout was 50.2%.

Results

References

1915 elections in Central America
1915 in Costa Rica
Elections in Costa Rica